Chulliyar River is one of the tributaries of the river Gayathripuzha. Gayathripuzha is one of the main  tributaries of the  Bharathapuzha River, the second-longest river in Kerala, south India.

View of Chulliar Dam with the western ghats as background . This is the southern part of the Palakkad Gap

Other tributaries of the river Gayathripuzha
Mangalam river
Ayalurpuzha
Vandazhippuzha
Meenkarappuzha
Chulliyar

Rivers of Thrissur district
Rivers of Idukki district
Bharathappuzha